Edward Selig Salomon (December 25, 1836 – July 18, 1913) was a German Jew who immigrated to the United States and served as a lieutenant colonel in Union in the American Civil War. After nomination for appointment to the grade of brevet brigadier general of volunteers to rank from March 13, 1865, by President Andrew Johnson on January 13, 1866, the United States Senate confirmed the appointment on March 12, 1866. Salomon later became governor of Washington Territory and a California legislator.

Early life and career
Salomon, who was Jewish, was born in the Duchy of Schleswig, the son of Caroline (Samuels) and Salomon M. Salomon. He emigrated to Illinois in 1856 and 5 years later, at age 24, was elected an alderman of Chicago's sixth ward in 1861, the youngest in Chicago history, and served until 1863. His cousin Edward Salomon, who also served as a general in the Civil War, later became Governor of Wisconsin.

Civil War
In July 1861, Salomon was commissioned as a first lieutenant in Colonel Friedrich Hecker's 24th Illinois Infantry Regiment. Disagreements arose between Hecker and some of his officers, after which Hecker and his supporters resigned, including Salomon. Salomon became a civilian again from December 1861 to September 1862. In August 1862, Hecker formed a new regiment, the 82nd Illinois Infantry, or the "Second Hecker Regiment", composed mainly of German, Jewish, Swedish, and other European volunteers. Salomon joined and was promoted to the rank of lieutenant colonel on September 26, 1862.

Salomon became a hero during the Battle of Gettysburg. He had two horses shot out from under him and assumed command of the regiment when Hecker was wounded. Fellow-immigrant major general Carl Schurz, his corps commander, described him during the battle: "He was the only soldier at Gettysburg who did not dodge when Lee's guns thundered; he stood up, smoked his cigar and faced the cannon balls with the sang froid of a Saladin ..."

Early in 1864, Hecker resigned, leaving Salomon in permanent command of the regiment, although still as a lieutenant colonel. Salomon led the regiment during the Atlanta Campaign and through the capture of Atlanta. Assigned to deliver messages to Nashville, he missed the famous march to the sea. In December 1864, he rejoined the regiment and finished out the war with them. On March 13, 1865, Salomon received a promotion to brigadier general on for his “distinguished gallantry and meritorious service.”

On January 13, 1866, President Andrew Johnson nominated Salomon for appointment to the grade of brevet brigadier general of volunteers, to rank from March 13, 1865, and the United States Senate confirmed the appointment on March 12, 1866.

Postbellum activities
After the war, Salomon returned to Chicago where he was elected Cook County Clerk as a Republican in the fall of 1865, serving until November 1869.

On March 4, 1870, President Ulysses S. Grant appointed Salomon governor of Washington Territory. He was caught up in the political scandals of the Grant administration and resigned in 1872. The Pacific Tribune newspaper, commenting on his resignation, lauded his honesty and integrity. General Philip Sheridan led a delegation that presented him with a silver table service in recognition of his fine record of service, high qualities as a citizen, and as a friend.

Salomon moved to San Francisco, where he practiced law. In 1898 Salomon was appointed assistant district attorney for the city and county. He was elected to the California State Assembly in 1890.

Salomon died in San Francisco on July 18, 1913, and is buried in Salem Memorial Cemetery, Colma, California.

See also

List of American Civil War brevet generals
German Americans in the Civil War

Notes

References
Eicher, John H., & Eicher, David J., Civil War High Commands, Stanford University Press, 2001, .

Further reading
Available online through the Washington State Library's Classics in Washington History collection

1836 births
1913 deaths
People from the Duchy of Schleswig
Politicians from Chicago
German emigrants to the United States
19th-century German Jews
Governors of Washington Territory
Jewish American state governors of the United States
People of Illinois in the American Civil War
Union Army colonels
Chicago City Council members
Members of the California State Assembly
Jewish American military personnel
19th-century American politicians
Jewish American people in Illinois politics
Jewish American state legislators in California
Jewish American people in Washington (state) politics
Illinois Republicans
Cook County Clerks